Architect Magazine is the successor to Architecture, one of a series of periodicals published from before World War I by the American Institute of Architects.

Overview
This is the sixth iteration of a magazine about the field associated with American Institute of Architects and its members. This iteration stylizes their publication's name with a capital M: Architect Magazine, with Architectureal Design as a subtitle.

At times they run a series by a famous, award-winning architect; in 2007 one such series itself won an award. In 2014, they wrote about 1898-born Julia Morgan a "Pioneering Female Architect" who, because she "was experienced in reinforced concrete as she was in European design," was chosen, in the aftermath of the 1906 San Francisco earthquake, to design the rebuilding of a major hotel.

History
The first of American Institute of Architects'''s periodicals was the Quarterly Bulletin. This  was followed, beginning in 1913, by:
 Journal of the American Institute of Architects (through 1928)
 Octagon (1929-1994), at which point the above title was resumed, through 1957
 The American Institute of Architects Journal (AIA Journal) ArchitectureAs of when the last of these ceased publication (2006), the title was Architecture: The AIA Journal. The successor is not owned by but is affiliated with AIA, and uses their name on their masthead''.

Features
In addition to running interviews with and articles about those in the field, be it in teaching about or doing, some of their articles go beyond the actual design work, such as labor conditions for their projects, both in non-Western countries and in the USA. They've covered other types of architectural disputes, including international ones such as regarding "the Eiffel Tower to temporarily alter its silhouette."

Notes

References

External links
 
 Volumes 1-10 of the original incarnation
 1957, 1959-2006

Architecture magazines
Magazines established in 2006
Visual arts magazines published in the United States